Brett Easterbrook is an American politician in Alabama. Easterbrook is a Republican member of Alabama House of Representatives for District 65.

Education 
Easterbrook earned a Bachelor of Science degree from Auburn University in 1989.

Career 

Before entering politics, Easterbrook worked as an accountant for Mauldin & Jenkins from 1989 to 1991. He then worked as a contractor for Easterbrook Homes from 2005 to 2009.

Currently, he is on the Education Policy Committee, Insurance Committee, State Government Committee, and the Transportation, Infrastructure and Utilities Committee in the Alabama House of Representatives.

Personal life 

Easterbrook was born in Casper, Wyoming on October 10, 1963. Currently he resides in Four Point, Alabama with his wife, Betsy.

References

Living people
Republican Party members of the Alabama House of Representatives
21st-century American politicians
Auburn University alumni
People from Casper, Wyoming
1963 births